The 1987 African Cup of Champions Clubs final was the final of the 1987 African Cup of Champions Clubs.

It was a football tie held over two legs in December 1987 between Al Ahly  of Egypt, and Al-Hilal Club of Sudan. Second leg with the last match for the Egyptian legend Mahmoud El Khatib that announced his retirement three days after the match.

Al Ahly won the final with aggregate 2-0, first leg 0-0 and second 2-0.

Qualified teams

Venues

Khartoum International Stadium
The Khartoum International Stadium is a multi-purpose stadium in Khartoum, Sudan.  It is currently used mostly for football matches.  The stadium has a capacity of 23,000 people. It is also the home stadium of the Sudanese national football team and of the club Al Ahli SC Khartoum. In 2010, it was renovated for the 2011 African cup of nations championships .

Cairo International Stadium

Cairo International Stadium, formerly known as Nasser Stadium, is an Olympic-standard, multi-use stadium with an all-seated capacity of 75,000. The architect of the stadium is the German Werner March, who had built from 1934 to 1936 the Olympic Stadium in Berlin. Before becoming an all seater stadium, it had the ability to hold over 100,000 spectators, reaching a record of 120,000. It is the foremost Olympic-standard facility befitting the role of Cairo, Egypt as the center of events in the region. It is also the 69th largest stadium in the world. Located in Nasr City; a suburb north east of Cairo, it was completed in 1960, and was inaugurated by President Gamal Abd El Nasser on 23 July that year, the eighth anniversary of the Egyptian Revolution of 1952.

Road to final

Format
The final was decided over two legs, with aggregate goals used to determine the winner. If the sides were level on aggregate after the second leg, the away goals rule would have been applied, and if still level, the tie would have proceeded directly to a penalty shootout (no extra time is played).

Matches

First leg

Second leg

Notes and references

External links

Final
1987
1
Al-Hilal Club (Omdurman) matches
Al Ahly SC matches
African Cup of Champions Clubs Finals